Staw  is a village in the administrative district of Gmina Szczytniki, within Kalisz County, Greater Poland Voivodeship, in west-central Poland.

The village has an approximate population of 600.

References

Staw
Kalisz Governorate